Epsilon TV or ETV, in  (alternative romanization: Epsilon Tileorasi), is one of the three legal terrestrial TV channels of the region of Central Greece and Euboea Island, based in the city of Livadeia.

History
Epsilon TV was founded in 1995 by former Minister Aristides Tsiplakos and the productive classes of Boeotia. In 2004, it maintained studios in Athens (Galatsi) and in 2007 in Chalcis.

Channel broadcast
Epsilon TV, from 1995 until August 2014 was transmitting in Analog Mode from Parnes mountain of Attica (UHF CH22), from Chlomo Mountain of Fthiotida (UHF CH51), from Profit Elias of Livadeia (UHF CH55) and from Mount Parnassus (UHF CH62). On 2008 was approved for Digital Transmission, together with the two other television stations of the same Region (Ena TV and Star Channel), so from August 2014 started its Digital transmission from Parnes Mountain and from November 2014 switched all its Analog Transmissions in Digital mode. Now all the three TV Channels of Central Greece are transmitting in Digital from the Channels 42 and 36 UHF/SFN, to all of Central Greece and Euboea island, including a part of Athens, but with very weak signal, because its transmission from Parnes Mountain is beaming the Euboea island. See on the right the todays Coverage map of Epsilon TV, Star Channel and Ena TV.

Ownership
John E. Pantazopoulos, Telecommunication Engineer D.Sc.: 25.00% (CEO)
Panagiotis E. Angelopoulos: 25.00%
Ioannis K. Papaloukas: 25.00%
Spyridon Ch. Vlachos: 25.00%

References

Lyngsat Stream - Epsilon Tileorasi
Greek National Council for Radio and Television - "Regional Coverage TV Stations in legal operation (Latest Excel file in Greek, folder 438)"

External links

Television channels in Greece
Television channels and stations established in 1995
Mass media in Livadeia